The Double-heart of Stacked Stones or the Twin-Heart Fish Trap is a stone fishing weir located on the north side of Cimei Township, Penghu County, Taiwan. It is a well-preserved ancient fish trap made by stacking stones to form a trap that resembles a flying heart.

See also
 List of tourist attractions in Taiwan

References

Buildings and structures in Penghu County
Fish traps
Tourist attractions in Penghu County